Captain Michael Etiang is a Ugandan airline pilot and business executive, who serves as the Chief Pilot of Uganda National Airlines Company, the revived national airline of Uganda.

Background and education
Etiang was born in Tororo District. His late father, Paul Orono Etiang (1938—2020), was a civil servant, politician, diplomat and community leader.

Michael attended Bentham Grammar School, in the United Kingdom. He obtained a bachelor's degree in Law and Politics from the School of Oriental and African Studies at the University of London. As of April 2018, Etiang had over 18 years of flying experience, with over 12,000 flying hours on his record.

Career
At the time he was hired for this job, he was serving as the Training Manager (CRJ Aircraft) at RwandAir, where he has been employed since 2012. He has also served as Training Captain at Fly540 and Jetlink, both in neighboring Kenya. He played the same role at Garuda Indonesia, the national airline of Indonesia. His aviation career, spans a period of over twenty years, as of 2019.

In his new position as Chief Pilot at Uganda National Airlines Company, he is responsible for making sure that all pilots are trained and are current with their competencies and skills. He also manages flight and ground personnel, schedules flights and coordinates aircraft maintenance. He serves as a member of the airline's senior management team.

He was part of the four-person Ugandan cockpit crew who piloted the first two CRJ-900 aircraft purchased by Uganda National Airlines Company, from Mirabel, Quebec, Canada, to Entebbe, Uganda, in April 2019.

During 2020, he underwent further training and qualified as Captain on the Airbus 330 class of aircraft. On 22 December 2020, Captain Etiang, led the crew who flew the first A330-800 to join the Uganda Airlines fleet. The aircraft, 5X-NIL named Mount Elgon flew from Toulouse, France to Entebbe, Uganda, as Flight UR404.

See also
 Transport in Uganda
 List of airports in Uganda
 Ephraim Bagenda

References

External links
 Website of Revived Uganda Airlines
 Kasaija: I shake when signing money to corrupt ministries As at 25 May 2018.

Living people
Year of birth missing (living people)
Ugandan aviators
Commercial aviators
Ugandan business executives
People from Tororo District
People from Eastern Region, Uganda